Madina Ulfatovna Biktagirova (born 20 September 1964 in Osh, Kirghiz Soviet Socialist Republic, Soviet Union) is a retired long-distance runner. She competed for both Belarus and Russia.

Professional career
In 1992, Biktagirova set a course record at the Los Angeles Marathon in a time of 2:26:23.

Biktagirova set her personal best in 1997, clocking 2:24:46. She won the 2002 and 2003 editions of the Nagano Olympic Commemorative Marathon.

Olympic career
Biktagirova competed in three Olympic games under three different flags. She finished fourth in the marathon at the 1992 Olympics, competing for the Unified Olympic team. After the race, she tested positive for norephedrine and became the first Olympic marathoner disqualified for failing a drug test.

Biktagirova competed in the marathon at the 1996 Summer Olympics for Belarus, a race in which she did not finish. She ran the marathon for Russia at the 2000 Summer Olympics, finishing in 5th place.

Achievements

References

External links

1964 births
Living people
People from Osh
Belarusian female long-distance runners
Russian female long-distance runners
Russian female marathon runners
Belarusian sportspeople in doping cases
Russian sportspeople in doping cases
Athletes (track and field) at the 1992 Summer Olympics
Athletes (track and field) at the 1996 Summer Olympics
Athletes (track and field) at the 2000 Summer Olympics
Olympic athletes of the Unified Team
Olympic athletes of Belarus
Olympic athletes of Russia
Doping cases in athletics
European Athletics Championships medalists
Soviet Athletics Championships winners